Mumtaz Sorcar (born 15 September 1986) is an Indian actress and model. She is the daughter of the famous magician PC Sorcar Junior and Joysri Sorcar. Mumtaz started her career with a music video for singer Mehreen from Bangladesh. She first appeared in the Bengali film 033 directed by Birsa Dasgupta.

Education and activities
Her schooling was from Modern High School for Girls, Kolkata. She completed her BA.LLB from South Calcutta Law College under Calcutta University.
Her hobby is playing sports and as an athlete, she was trained in boxing at a South Kolkata Club under the auspices of the Bengal Amateur Boxing Federation. She also underwent training in judo and is a YMCA gold medalist in shot put. Mumtaz is also a classical jazz dancer.

Career
Her debut film was 033, which was directed by Birsha Dasgupta. She appeared in Shoumik Sen's No Poblem in the initial days of her film career.She signed many Tollywood films thereafter and  The film is currently in post-production and is set to be released in 2012.

2010
She got a role in the Bengali film Musalmanir Galpo (The Story of the Muslim Girl). She played a beautiful Hindu girl, "Kamala", who was abducted by the notorious dacoit "Madhumallar" in the film. The film is based on the last story Rabindranath Tagore wrote. Biplab Chatterjee was one of her co-stars.

Then, she followed up with 033, which was a joint venture between Moxie Group and NDTV Imagine. It was a film about a group of youngsters who form a bangla band and named it after the city's STD code (033). She played "Ria". The music in the film was scored by Chandrabindoo (band). Her co-stars in the film included Swastika Mukherjee, Parambrata Chatterjee, Sabyasachi Chakrabarty and Rudranil Ghosh.

2011
2011 saw her in the Telefilms Kolkatar Jongole and Rajbarir Rahasya, based on the famous adventure series Kakababu, by Sunil Gangopadhyay. Future releases are in slot in the corresponding series. These Telefilms are produced by Mahua Films.

2012
2012 started with a big hit for her, with the success of Bhooter Bhabishyat. The portrayal of a die-hard romantic young girl "Koel" added another feather to her crown. Her co-actors included Parambrata Chatterjee, Sabyasachi Chakrabarty, Swastika Mukherjee and Mir.

Her next film Kanchenjunga Express is of the suspense Thriller (genre). The story revolves around the character "Nandini", who works for a NGO and is married 3 times and dies under mysterious circumstances. The film is directed by Arnab Ghosh and was scheduled to be released mid June '12.

2013
She has also appeared in the film Atmogopan, by Somnath Sen. Mumtaz plays the character "Anu", Subhash Chatterjee essays her father.

2016
Mumtaz played the role of Payal Mukherjee appeared in the film Dark Chocolate.

Mumtaz had her Tamil debut in the movie, Irudhi Suttru where she played the role of Lakshmi(Luz), a young female boxer. Her co-star were R. Madhavan and Ritika Singh. She made her Bollywood debut in the same role for same movie in the Hindi version named Saala Khadoos.

2020
In the upcoming Tamil movie C/O Kaadhal, Mumtaz is playing the role of a Muslim girl Salima, where the film shows that love has no age and one can fall in love anytime if they meet the right person. She also appeared on the TV series Charitraheen and web series thriller Shobdo Jobdo streaming on Hoichoi.

Filmography

Films

Web series

See also
 P. C. Sorcar
 Maneka Sorcar
 Moubani Sorcar

References

External links
 
 
 
 

Living people
1986 births
Actresses from Kolkata
Female models from Kolkata
Indian film actresses
Indian web series actresses
Bengali actresses
Bengali female models
Actresses in Bengali cinema
Actresses in Tamil cinema
Actresses in Telugu cinema
Actresses in Hindi cinema
University of Calcutta alumni
Mumtaz
Indian expatriate actresses in Bangladesh
21st-century Bengalis
21st-century Indian actresses